The Slavic dialects of Greece are the Eastern South Slavic dialects of Macedonian and Bulgarian spoken by minority groups in the regions of Macedonia and Thrace in northern Greece. Usually, dialects in Thrace are classified as Bulgarian, while the dialects in Macedonia are classified as Macedonian, with the exception of some eastern dialects which can also be classified as Bulgarian. Until the official codification of Macedonian in 1945 many linguists considered all these to be Bulgarian dialects. However, some linguists opposed this view and considered Macedonian dialects as comprising an independent language distinct from both Bulgarian and Serbo-Croatian.

Slavic dialects spoken in the region of Greek Macedonia 
The continuum of Macedonian and Bulgarian is spoken today in the prefectures of Florina and Pella, and to a lesser extent in Kastoria, Imathia, Kilkis, Thessaloniki, Serres and Drama.

According to Riki van Boeschoten, the Slavic dialects of Greek Macedonia are divided into three main dialects (Eastern, Central and Western), of which the Eastern dialect is used in the areas of Serres and Drama, and is closest to Bulgarian, the Western dialect is used in Florina and Kastoria, and is closest to Macedonian, the Central dialect is used in the area between Edessa and Salonica and is an intermediate between Macedonian and Bulgarian. Trudgill classifies certain peripheral dialects in the far east of Greek Macedonia as part of the Bulgarian language area and the rest as Macedonian dialects. Victor Friedman considers those Macedonian dialects, particularly those spoken as west as Kilkis, to be transitional to the neighbouring South Slavic language.

Macedonian dialectologists Božidar Vidoeski and Blaže Koneski consider the eastern Macedonian dialects to be transitional to Bulgarian, including the Maleševo-Pirin dialect.

Bulgarian dialectologists claim all dialects and do not recognize the Macedonian.

The nasal vowels are absent in all Slavic dialects except for the dialects of Macedonian in Greece and the Lechitic dialects (Polabian, Slovincian, Polish and Kashubian). This, along with the preservation of the paroxitonic in the Kostur dialect and Polish, is part of a series of isoglosses shared with the Lechitic dialects, which led to the thesis of a genetic relationship between Proto-Bulgarian and Proto-Macedonian with Proto-Polish and Proto-Kashubian.

The Old Church Slavonic language, the earliest recorded Slavic language, was based on the Salonica dialects. Church Slavonic, long-used as a state language further north in East and West Slavic states and as the only one in Wallachia and Moldavia until the 18th century, influenced other Slavic languages on all levels, including morphonology and vocabulary. 70% of Church Slavonic words are common to all Slavic languages, the influence of Church Slavonic is especially pronounced in Russian, which today consists of mixed native and Church Slavonic vocabulary.

Fringe views 
A series of ethnological and pseudo-linguistic works were published by three Greek teachers, notably Boukouvalas and Tsioulkas, whose publications demonstrate common ideological and methodological similarities. They published etymological lists tracing every single Slavic word to Ancient Greek with fictional correlations, and they were ignorant of the dialects and the Slavic languages entirely. Among them, Boukouvalas promoted an enormous influence of the Greek language on a Bulgarian idiom and a discussion about their probable Greek descent. Tsioulkas followed him by publishing a large book, where he "proved" through an "etymological" approach, that these idioms are a pure Ancient Greek dialect. A publication of the third teacher followed, Giorgos Georgiades, who presented the language as a mixture of Greek, Turkish and other loanwords, but was incapable of defining the dialects as either Greek or Slav.

Serbian dialectology does not usually extend the Serbian dialects to Greek Macedonia, but an unconventional classification has been made by Aleksandar Belić, a convinced Serbian nationalist, who regarded the dialects as Serbian. In his classification he distinguished three categories of dialects in Greek Macedonia: a Serbo-Macedonian dialect, a Bulgaro-Macedonian territory where Serbian is spoken and a Non-Slavic territory.

Ban for use, language shift and language death
After the conclusion of the First World War a widespread policy of Hellenisation was implemented in the Greek region of Macedonia. Personal and topographic names were forcibly changed to their Greek versions. Cyrillic inscriptions across Northern Greece were removed from gravestones and churches. Under the regime of Ioannis Metaxas a law was passed banning the Bulgarian language. Many people who broke the rule were deported, or arrested, and beaten. During the Cold War cases of discrimination against people who spoke in local dialects had been reported. In 1959 the inhabitants of three villages adopted a 'language oath', renouncing their Slavic dialect on the initiative of local government officials. After the fall of Communism the issue has continued. In 1994 report by the Human Rights Watch, Greece implemented a program, which refuses the teaching of any Slavic language. The Greek state continues to exclude the Slavic speakers of Greek Macedonia from operating TV-, or radio-stations in local Slavic. As result per Christian Voss in the Western and Central areas of Greek Macedonia is visible the typical situation of language shift and decreased proficiency from the Slavic vernacular to Greek as follows: "Households with almost monoglot Slavic-speaking grandparents, bilingual parents, and monoglot Greek-speaking children with a passive knowledge of Slavic." On the other hand, in Eastern Macedonia are a symptoms of full assimilation, which led to a language death.

Slavic dialects spoken in the region of Thrace 

Some of the Rup dialects of the Bulgarian language are spoken by the Pomaks in Western Thrace in Greece. These dialects are native also in Bulgaria, and are classified as part of the Smolyan subdialect. Not all Pomaks speak this dialect as their mother language. It is generally qualified by Bulgarian researchers as an “archaic dialect” with some conservative features, which bear witness to an intermediate state of transition from Old Bulgarian/Old Church Slavonic to the modern Bulgarian language.

Attempts of codification

Greek governmental codification

Under the 1920 Treaty of Sèvres, Greece had agreed to open schools for minority-language children. In September 1924 Greece also agreed to a protocol with Bulgaria to place its Slavic-speaking minority under the protection of the League of Nations as Bulgarians. However, the Greek parliament refused to ratify the protocol due to objections from Serbia, and from Greeks who considered the Slavic-speakers to be Slavicized Greeks rather than Slavic people. Vasilis Dendramis, the Greek representative in the League of the Nations, stated that the Macedonian Slav language was neither Bulgarian, nor Serbian, but an independent language. The Greek government went ahead with the publication in May 1925 of the Abecedar, described by contemporary Greek writers as a primer for "the children of Slav speakers in Greece ... printed in the Latin script and compiled in the Macedonian dialect." The book's publication sparked controversy in Greek Macedonia, along with Bulgaria and Serbia. The Bulgarians and Serbs objected to the book being printed in Latin alphabet. In January 1926, the region of Florina saw extensive protests by Greek and pro-Greek Slavic speakers campaigning against the primer's publication, demanding the government change its policies on minority education. As result although some books reached villages in Greek Macedonia, it was never used in their schools.

Greek communists’ codification

After the Tito–Stalin split in 1948, under the auspices of some Macedonian intellectuals in Bucharest, anti-Yugoslav alphabet, grammar, and primer closer to Bulgarian, purified of the Serbo-Croatian loanwords of the  language of Skopje were created. The Communist Party of Greece led by Nikos Zahariadis took the side of the Cominform. After the defeat of communists in the Greek Civil War in 1949, a hunt for Titoist spies began in the midst of Greek political immigrants - civil war refugees, living in socialist countries in Eastern Europe (often coming there after a brief stay in the so-called “Tito's traitorous fascist Yugoslavia"). As a result, the Greek communist publisher "Nea Ellada" issued a Macedonian grammar (1952) and developed a different alphabet.  Between 1952 and 1956, the Macedonian Department of Nea Hellas published a number of issues in this literary standard, officially called "Macedonian language of the Slavomacedonians from Greek or Aegean Macedonia". This failed attempt of codification included the Ъ, Ь, Ю, Я, Й and was proclaimed as non-serbianised. However it was merely a form of Bulgarian. This codification did not gain widespread acceptance. The Soviet-Yugoslav rapprochement from the mid-1950s probably helped to put this codification to an end. The grammar was prepared by a team headed by Atanas Peykov. Atanas Peikov himself came to Romania from Bulgaria, where till 1951 he had worked at the Informbureau of Hellas Press. Although this "Aegean Macedonian language" legitimized the symbolic importance of the "Macedonian language" and thus facilitated the later spread of the standard Yugoslav Macedonian norm among the Aegean emigrants, it also delayed this process, creating certain reservations towards the Yugoslav Macedonian standard. Greek refugees educated in this norm were nearly unable to adopt the Yugoslav version later.

Communist refugees from Greece in Australia 

The Macedonian Greek Civil War Refugees in Australia issued a Makedonska Iskra (Macedonian Spark). It was the first Macedonian newspaper published in Australia, from 1946 to 1957. The Makedonska Iskra was also thrown into confusion by the expulsion of Yugoslavia from the Cominform. The newspaper was printed in the Latin alphabet. Its articles were not in standard Macedonian but in local Slavic dialects of Greece. Some of the Slavic texts were in mixed Bulgaro-Macedonian language or were written in Bulgarian language. A monthly with national distribution, it commenced in Perth and later moved to Melbourne and Sydney.

Pomak language

In Greece, attempts to write the Pomak language in formal publications have been criticized because their script, whether it was in Greek or in Latin. Since the 1990s several publications in Pomak dialect have been issued using either script. Some criticisms to these publications were related to their funding sources. For example, by the cases using the Greek script, two volumes of a textbooks were printed in 2004. Their author was Nikos Kokkas and  publisher Pakethra. Its funding was provided by a Greek businessman and directly through his company. The preface of a Pomak primer presents it as one of the “lesser-spoken languages” of Europe. The use of Pomak in writing is very limited. It is even not used in the local Pomak newspaper "Zagalisa", that is published in Greek. Recently, the use of Pomak is preferred in a new  local newspaper "Natpresh". Pomak is not being actively promoted by either Pomak communities or by Greek authorities. The result is a strong language shift in Greece towards Turkish.

Features

See also
 Slavic-speakers of Greek Macedonia
 Eastern South Slavic
 Pomak language
 Fallmerayer's Greek theory

References

Bibliography
 Trudgill P. (2000) "Greece and European Turkey: From Religious to Linguistic Identity" in Language and Nationalism in Europe (Oxford: Oxford University Press)
 Iakovos D. Michailidis (1996) "Minority Rights and Educational Problems in Greek Interwar Macedonia: The Case of the Primer 'Abecedar'". Journal of Modern Greek Studies 14.2 329–343

External links
 Dialectial dictionary of the Oschima speech of the Lerin dialect

Bulgarian language
Macedonian language
Languages of Greece